Petnjica Municipality (Montenegrin: Opština Petnjica / Општина Петњица) is one of the municipalities of Montenegro. The municipality is located in northeastern region of Montenegro, being part of Bihor and Sandžak regions. The center is Petnjica. Petnjica Municipality was created in 2013, when it was split from Berane Municipality.

Subdivisions
Petnjica Municipality is divided into 7 subdivisions (Montenegrin Latin: mjesne zajednice, singular: mjesna zajednica) with 25 settlements (naselja, singular: naselje). Petnjica Municipality Subdivisions; Bor Subdivision (Bor and Ponor), Petnjica Subdivision (Petnjica, Godočelje, Johovica, Lagatore, Lazi, Pahulj and Radmanci), Savin Bor Subdivision (Savin Bor, Dašča Rijeka, Dobrodole and Kruščica), Javorova Subdivision (Javorova, Murovac and Poroče). Trpezi Subdivision (Trpezi and Kalica), Tucanje Subdivision (Tucanje, Azane, Lješnica, Orahovo and Vrševo) and Vrbica (Upper and Lower).

Local parliament

Demographics
Village of Petnjica is the administrative center of Petnjica Municipality, which had a population of 5,455 in 2011. The settlement of Petnjica itself had a population of 539. Ethnic groups in Petnjica Municipality, 2011 census;

References

 
Municipalities of Montenegro
States and territories established in 2013
2013 establishments in Montenegro
States and territories established in 1945
1945 establishments in Montenegro
States and territories disestablished in 1957